Yi Huan (born 19 October 1969), occasionally credited as I-Huan, is a Taiwanese comic creator of manhua aimed at girls.  She has written and illustrated many series, two of which have been licensed for publication in English.

Biography
Yi was born October 19, 1969, in Keelung, Taiwan. After graduating from law school in 1992, she joined the staff of Tong Li Comics as an editor. In 1994, she won a contest for new artists and then began her career as a professional comics creator. Her first professional manhua, Proclaiming and Loving, was published in 1995.

Publications
Yi has written and illustrated numerous manhua, many published by Tong Li.  Titles include:
 Close To My Sweetheart (甜心零距離), currently serialized in Margret (瑪格麗特)
 Little Witch's Diary (小巫女的童話日記), 2005–2006
 Fantastic Tales (星月幻境), 2004–2005
 Divine Melody, currently serialized in Star Girls
 Real/Fake Princess, 2002–2003
 Seal of the Sacred Moon (聖月之印), 2001–2005
 Spirit of the Ocean (碧海精灵), 1997–1999
 Secret (秘密), 1996
 Proclaiming and Loving (宣和戀), 1995–1996

Real/Fake Princess has been released in its five-volume entirety in English by DrMaster.  DrMaster has also licensed Divine Melody and will begin its release in January 2009.  Yi's comics have also been translated and distributed in Thai, Vietnamese, Hungarian, Korean, and Russian.

References

External links
  Yi Huan Official Website
  Yi Huan Pixnet Blog
  Yi Huan Myweb Blog

1969 births
Living people
Taiwanese female comics artists
Female comics writers
People from Keelung
Taiwanese comics artists
Taiwanese comics writers